The 1978 Harvard Crimson football team was an American football team that represented Harvard University during the 1978 NCAA Division I-A football season. Harvard tied for fifth place in the Ivy League.

In their eighth year under head coach Joe Restic, the Crimson compiled a 4–4–1 record and outscored opponents 196 to 189. Steven C. Potysman was the team captain.

Harvard's 2–4–1  conference record tied for fifth in the Ivy League standings. The Crimson were outscored 168 to 162 by Ivy opponents.

Harvard played its home games at Harvard Stadium in the Allston neighborhood of Boston, Massachusetts.

Schedule

References

Harvard
Harvard Crimson football seasons
Harvard Crimson football
Harvard Crimson football